Hani i Elezit or Elez Han ( or Hani i Elezit; , Đeneral Janković; officially Елез Хан, Elez Han) is a town and municipality located in the Ferizaj District of Kosovo. According to the 2011 census, the town of Elez Han has 2,533 inhabitants, while the municipality has 9,403 inhabitants.

It is one of the new formed municipalities formed in September 2005. It was previously part of the Kaçanik municipality. The town is located in the south-eastern part of Kosovo. It borders Kaçanik municipality to the north and with North Macedonia, the municipalities of Jegunovce (west), Čučer-Sandevo (east), Saraj and Gjorče Petrov (south).

History
The town has been inhabited since the 1500s. Its name in Ottoman times was İlyas-Han. The town was renamed after Serbian general Božidar Janković in 1914 by a decision of the Serbian Council of Ministers. In 2012, the Kosovo Assembly approved the renaming of the town to Elez Han for its publications in Serbian and English; the name remains Hani i Elezit in Albanian.

Population
In 2011, the population was 9,389. Apart from 30 Kosovo Bosniaks, the municipal unit is ethnically homogeneous (Kosovo Albanian). The municipality has ten villages, two of which are uninhabited.

Economy

The municipality has a total of 250 family shops and small businesses registered. The economy of Elez Han is mainly based on three companies/enterprises: Sharr-Çimentorja (cement factory), Kosovaplast (plastic factory), and Salonit (roof covers factory). All the aforementioned were part of the Šar Combinate before 1989. Sharr-Çimentorja employs 770 people, Salonit employs 280 employees, and Kosovaplast has 100 employees.

Cafes, restaurants and retail trade are also vibrant. Private shops and other commercial businesses operating in the Pilot Municipal Unit are mostly family-operated enterprises, with approximately 200 employees. Nevertheless, a considerable part of population works in the agriculture sector or remains unemployed.

Public Services

Health
There is one hospital providing primary health care. There are two doctors, one dentist, one lab technician and nine nurses. The hospital provides services until late afternoon, while emergency cases are treated by the hospital in Kačanik due to the lack of staff in Elez Han. The Municipal Unit is making efforts to hire two additional doctors to increase efficiency, but this process is very slow due to the lack of vacant positions in the staffing table.

Education
There are three primary schools (1,673 pupils) located in Elez Han and the villages of Paljivodenica and Gorance. There is a secondary school located in Elez Han with a total of 416 pupils.

Notes

References

External links

Municipality website

Populated places in Kosovo
Kosovo–North Macedonia border crossings
Municipalities of Kosovo